The 1956 United States Senate election in Ohio took place on November 6, 1956. Incumbent Senator George H. Bender, who won a special election to complete the term of the late Senator Robert A. Taft, ran for re-election to a full six-year term. He was defeated by Democratic Governor Frank Lausche.

General election

Candidates
George H. Bender, incumbent Senator since 1954 (Republican)
Frank J. Lausche, Governor of Ohio (1945–47 and since 1949) (Democratic)

Results

See also 
 1956 United States Senate elections

References

1956
Ohio
United States Senate